Paula la Torre Regal (born 15 April 1999) is a Peruvian badminton player.

Career 
In 2016, she won the silver medal at the Pan Am Badminton Championships in the women's doubles event partnered with Luz Maria Zornoza, they were defeated by Michelle Tong and Josephine Wu in the final round. She also competed at the 2016 BWF World Junior Championships and reached the second round.

Achievements

Pan Am Championships 
Women's doubles

South American Games 
Women's singles

Women's doubles

Pan Am Junior Championships 
Girls' doubles

BWF International Challenge/Series (1 title, 7 runners-up) 
Women's doubles

Mixed doubles

  BWF International Challenge tournament
  BWF International Series tournament
  BWF Future Series tournament

References

External links 
 

Living people
1999 births
Sportspeople from Lima
Peruvian female badminton players
Badminton players at the 2019 Pan American Games
Pan American Games competitors for Peru
South American Games silver medalists for Peru
South American Games bronze medalists for Peru
South American Games medalists in badminton
Competitors at the 2018 South American Games
21st-century Peruvian women